Evolutionary approaches to postpartum depression examine the syndrome from the framework of evolutionary theory.

Postpartum (or postnatal) depression refers to major and minor episodes of depression within the first 12 months after delivery. Depression during pregnancy is referred to as prenatal (or antenatal) depression. Symptoms of postpartum depression include sad or depressed mood, feelings of worry, anxiety, guilt, or worthlessness, hypersomnia or insomnia, difficulty concentrating, anhedonia, somatic pain, changes in appetite, weight loss or weight gain, moodiness, irritability, restlessness, and fatigue.

Women may also have doubts about their ability to care for a new infant, difficulty bonding with the infant, or thoughts of harming themselves or their infants. In the DSM-V, diagnosis is made under major depressive disorder, with the added specifier “With peripartum onset” if the episode occurs during pregnancy or the first four weeks postpartum. Postpartum depression is not to be conflated with postpartum psychosis, which is qualitatively different.

A meta-analysis found that up to 12.7% of pregnant women experience an episode of major depression, while as many as 18.4% experience depression at some point in their pregnancy. However, they did not find a significant difference between these and rates of depression in women at nonchildbearing times. Similarly, one meta-analysis found rates of depression of up to 12.9% within the first year postpartum, and other studies have found similar rates.

There is also growing evidence that PPD is under-reported and under-diagnosed, raising concerns that a number of women suffer untreated. Cross-cultural research is often difficult to replicate and synthesize. For instance, one meta-analysis found rates of PPD from 0% to 60% across 40 countries. It is likely that a number of cultural factors likely lead to under- and over-diagnosis in some countries.

Postpartum depression in men 
There is growing evidence that new fathers are also at risk of experiencing pre- and postpartum depression, although this remains understudied. Goodman found that during the first postpartum year, the incidence of paternal depression ranged from 1% to 25% in community samples, and from 24% to 50% among men whose partners were experiencing postpartum depression. Others have replicated the association between partner depression and paternal postpartum depression.

Another review found rates of postpartum depression in about 10% of sampled men, with higher rates at 3 to 6 months postpartum. Another review found that along with depression in their partners, low relationship satisfaction was also correlated with paternal postpartum depression. It may also be that adoptive fathers can be at risk of developing postadoption depression, although this requires further study.

Risk factors for postpartum depression 
Many studies have examined risk factors in peripartum depression. Although results are sometimes mixed, the factors listed in the table below have been associated with peripartum depression. A comprehensive meta-analysis found that the most strongly associated risk factors for postpartum depression to be stressful life events, previous history of depression, anxiety during pregnancy, low levels of social support, and low socioeconomic status.

One study found that the stress hormone placental corticotropin-releasing hormone (pCRH) mediated the relationship between prenatal family support and fewer depression symptoms postpartum. Studies have also shown that infant health issues represent a suite of risk factors for maternal depression, including preterm birth, low birthweight, birth complications, and infant illness. Another review have found additional risk factors including marital status, relationship quality, infant temperament, and self-esteem.

Some researchers have examined diet as a primary risk factor for depression. According to one review, the typical western diet often leads to inadequacies in n-3, folate, B vitamins, iron, and calcium. Depletion of these nutrients during pregnancy may increase a woman's risk for postpartum depression. Cultural factors may also pose risks for postpartum depression. For instance, in cultures with gender preferences for children, unmet preferences are a risk factor.

Evolutionary approaches to postpartum depression 
For evolutionary scientists, postpartum depression is of interest due to its relatively high rates and seemingly universal expression, which may provide evidence of functionality. However, postpartum depression is also detrimental to mothers, their infants, and decreases future reproductive success.

Mismatch hypothesis 
Another [In addition to?] evolutionary approach to postpartum depression is framed by the changes in human lifestyles in recent history. Hahn-Holbrook and Haselton review a number of lifestyle shifts that have affected humans since the development of agriculture. First, most people today consume grain-fed domesticated animal products rather than wild-caught animals. Unlike wild animals, domesticated animals have much lower levels of omega-3 fatty acids, which are essential to brain development and to fetal health. In support of the theory that postpartum depression may be related to modern diets, the authors find that rates of postpartum depression are lower in countries that consume higher amounts of seafood, which contain high levels of omega-3 fatty acids.

This hypothesis is weakened by the known poor reliability of measures of PPD in Asian samples, which often return low rates of postpartum depression in countries including Japan. Emerging evidence suggests that postpartum depression may be just as common in these samples, but is experienced differently and is not detected by measures including the Edinburgh Postnatal Depression Scale. Furthermore, a direct randomized control trial found no effect of supplementary omega-3 fatty acids in women with postpartum depression.

The authors also review the relationship between breastfeeding and postpartum depression. They do not specifically explore the child loss hypothesis, discussed above [Discussed where?], but instead examine evidence that breastfeeding is related to stress regulation and reduces negative affect, offering a buffer against the risk of postpartum depression. However, since most studies are cross-sectional the direction of this effect is yet to be determined as it may be that depressed women are less likely to breastfeed than non-depressed women.

Finally, the authors review evidence that lower rates of exercise and sun-exposure, common in Western lifestyles, have also been found to be related to postpartum depression. However, evidence is mixed. These hypotheses would be easy to test in randomized controlled trials, in which supplementary exercise and Vitamin D could be administered to test samples. However, evidence from direct trials is also mixed.

One of the more commonly cited mismatch hypotheses relates to changes in family networks and childcare routines. Hunter-gatherer families often live with their extended families and regularly share childcare duties, whereas Western families may live very far from their relatives and therefore must meet the demands of childcare themselves. This likely causes additional stress and anxiety in new parents, who do not have access to assistance from their family members. This aspect of the hypothesis is more difficult to test, as the relationship between family assistance and postpartum depression is likely more complicated.

Psychological pain hypothesis 
Others have focused on the crux of reproductive decision-making in humans, which is twofold. First there exists a tradeoff between present and future offspring. In life-history theory, organisms have limited reproductive energy which requires that trade-offs be made when choosing to invest in one infant over another or over additional mating opportunities. Secondly, there is a tradeoff between the quantity and quality of offspring.

Because women’s reproduction is more constrained than men’s by obligate energetic demands, women experience higher risks relative to decisions to invest or not invest. As such, a mechanism which served to signal to women that they faced a bad investment opportunity, would be evolutionarily adaptive. For instance, in modern, industrialized societies where mortality is low, parents are incentivized to invest more per child than parents who live in less stable environments or utilizing riskier subsistence strategies. See life history theory.

For example, Bereczkei et al. found that women in Hungary with higher rates of low birth-weight infants had shorter inter-birth intervals, corresponding to an additional 2–4 years of potential reproduction. These women had significantly more children by the end of their reproductive careers than women who did not have low birth-weight children, pointing to a tradeoff between offspring quantity and quality.

In this vein, some researchers hypothesized that postpartum depression is more likely to occur in mothers who are suffering a fitness cost, in order to inform them that they should reduce or withdraw investment in their infants. Support for this hypothesis was found in a population of hunter-horticulturalists, the Shuar, located in the Ecuadorian Amazon. Reasons for this could include lack of paternal or other social support, poor infant health, or birth complications, all of which are commonly associated with postpartum depression. Hagen also found support that postpartum depression could function as a bargaining strategy, in which parents who were not receiving adequate support from their partners withdrew their investment in order to elicit additional support. In support of this, Hagen found that postpartum depression in one spouse was related to increased levels of child investment in the other spouse. Furthermore, support was also found for a reduction in rates of postpartum depression for older women with few future reproductive opportunities. Another study reported similar findings.

Can PPD be adaptive and related to reduced fertility? 
There is undoubtedly a reproductive cost to experiencing postpartum depression which likely affects future reproductive strategies and child-spacing decisions. Specifically, Myers et al. found that women who experienced postpartum depression with their first or second birth had reduced likelihood of parity progression to a third birth, and lower completed fertility overall. Given this, how do adaptationist hypotheses explain postpartum depression? Hagen and Thornhill, for one, argue that limiting complete family size is one method of reducing parental investment in poor circumstances. Furthermore, they found evidence that poor maternal condition at birth one was highly correlated with poor condition at subsequent births, as such it could be the poor condition, not postpartum depression that drives lower fertility.

Cross-cultural variation in postpartum depression 
Cross-cultural rates of peri- and postpartum depression are difficult to interpret, as differences in cultural expressions of depression may lead to inaccurate diagnosis. The majority of screening instruments that test for peri- and postpartum depression were designed in Western contexts and as such emphasize symptoms that are common in Western countries. Studies have found that women in Asia tend to report more somatic symptoms during depressive episodes, including feeling head numbness. Affective symptoms, such as feelings of sadness and guilt, are more commonly reported in Western samples than in Hispanic, Asian, and African cultures. One of the most commonly used screening instruments for postpartum depression, the Edinburgh Postnatal Depression Scale, does not detect depression in Japanese women.

Early research returned mixed evidence regarding cross-cultural rates of postpartum depression. One review found similar rates of postpartum mental disorders across countries.  In a more recent meta-analysis including 143 studies with data from samples around the world, rates of PPD varied between 0 and 60%.  Another meta-analysis found rates of postpartum depression returned from self-reported questionnaires to vary from 1.9% to 82.1% in developing countries and from 5.2% to 74.0% in developed countries. Rates were much lower when structured clinical interviews used, yet still varied from 0.1% in Finland to 26.3% in India.

The reasons for these discrepancies are not fully understood, however, it may be that the often reported rates of postpartum depression of around 15% do not reflect true rates of postpartum depression experienced by women around the world. Variation may be due to differences in measurement techniques, socio-economic factors, symptom expression, or cultural factors relating to pregnancy and childbirth.

There is some evidence that cultures which designate an explicit postpartum period, in which new mothers are expected to rest and receive assistance from family and friends, have lower rates of postpartum depression. However, other studies have not found this effect.

Evolutionary approaches to postpartum depression offer frameworks that can be informative, even given these variations in rates of postpartum depression. Because evolutionary medicine explores causality and treatment from the perspective of universal human biology and psychology, these approaches may bring to light new perspectives on causes and treatments.

See also 
Evolutionary approaches to depression
Evolutionary psychology of parenting

References 

Major depressive disorder
Evolutionary psychology